The Queensland parliamentary term extension referendum was a one-question referendum held in the Australian state of Queensland on 23 March 1992. Electors were asked if they approved of extending the maximum term of the Parliament of Queensland from three years to four years. The referendum was conducted by the Electoral Commission Queensland (ECQ).

The referendum failed, with 811,078 No votes (51.1%) received to 772,647 Yes votes (48.9%).

A later 2016 referendum which combined an extension to four years with fixed-term elections was successful.

See also
 2016 Queensland term length referendum
 1981 New South Wales referendum

References

External links
 Electoral Commission Queensland: State Referendum 

term length
1991 elections in Australia
1991 referendums
2010s in Queensland